The Steel Wave: A Novel of World War II is a historical novel written by Jeff Shaara about Operation Overlord. The book is the second book in a trilogy written by Shaara.

The novel begins in January 1944, nearly six months before the invasion of Normandy. Nearly half of the novel deals with General Eisenhower, Winston Churchill, and the rest of the SHAEF's attempt to prepare for D-Day and Erwin Rommel's attempt to prepare for such an assault. The second half mostly deals with the first month of the invasion from the perspective of both Rommel, Eisenhower, and a composite Army Paratrooper Sergeant named Jesse Adams.

Reception
The book did very well upon its release, reaching the New York Times bestseller list soon after its release.

The Reference And Users Services Association of the American Library Association recognized it as a 2009 Notable Book.

External links
Official Website

References

2008 American novels
American historical novels
Novels set during World War II
Novels by Jeffrey Shaara
Fiction set in 1944
Operation Overlord
Ballantine Books books